Nord-Heggdal Chapel is a parish church of the Church of Norway in Molde Municipality in Møre og Romsdal county, Norway. It is located in the village of Nord-Heggdal on the southeastern shore of the island of Otrøya. It an annex church for the Midsund parish which is part of the Molde domprosti (arch-deanery) in the Diocese of Møre. The brown, wooden church was built in a rectangular style in 1974 by the architect Jostein Heggdal. The church seats about 100 people.

See also
List of churches in Møre

References

Molde
Churches in Møre og Romsdal
Rectangular churches in Norway
Wooden churches in Norway
20th-century Church of Norway church buildings
Churches completed in 1974
1974 establishments in Norway